The 2012 Czech Republic methanol poisonings occurred in September 2012 in the Czech Republic, Poland and Slovakia. In the course of several days, 38 people in the Czech Republic and 4 people in Poland died as a result of methanol poisoning and many others were taken to hospital. The poisonings continued for several years after the main wave. As of April 2014, there were 51 dead and many others suffered permanent health damage.

The Czech government established a central emergency response council and banned the sale of liquors with more than 30% alcohol by volume at food stands on 12 September, 2012. On 14 September, the ban was extended to any sale of all alcoholic beverages with an alcohol content above 20% vol. On 20 September, export of such products was banned as well. The restrictions on liquor sales were lifted on 27 September 2012.

The police systematically checked shops where liquors were on sale. Led by police vice president Václav Kučera, a special police team called Metyl coordinated the investigations. On 24 September, the police announced that the source of the methanol-contaminated alcohol had been identified. Two main suspects were arrested: Rudolf Fian, a businessman from Karviná of Slovak nationality, and Tomáš Křepela, a Czech company owner from Řitka. On 21 May, 2014, the two were sentenced to life imprisonment; eight others to imprisonment for 8 to 21 years.

As of May 2018, methanol was banned in the EU for use in windscreen washing or defrosting due to its risk of human consumption

Similar incidents in the past 
A similar incident, the Pärnu methanol poisoning incident, occurred in Pärnu county, Estonia, in September 2001, when 68 people died and 43 were left disabled after contents of stolen methanol canisters were used in production of bootleg liquor.

In popular culture
The 2018 film Metanol, produced by the Czech Television, focuses on the distributors of the toxic alcohol and aftermath of the poisonings, including the investigation and eventual trial of perpetrators.

References 

2012 in the Czech Republic 
2012 in Poland
2012 in Slovakia
2012 crimes in the Czech Republic 
2012 crimes in Poland
2012 crimes in Slovakia
Alcohol-related deaths in the Czech Republic
Methanol poisoning incidents
Deaths from food poisoning